Ole Gustav Gjekstad (born 29 November 1967) is a Norwegian handball player. He played 149 matches and scored 548 goals for the Norway men's national handball team between 1986 and 1995.  He participated at the 1993 World Men's Handball Championship.

He coached women's club Larvik HK 1999–2005. and again from 2011–2015. Since 2018 to 2023 he was coaching Vipers Kristiansand. With Vipers he won the Norwegian women's league in 2019, 2020, 2021, and 2022, and the Women's EHF Champions League in 2021 and 2022. Since 2023 he will be coaching Odense Håndbold.

Honours
 EHF Champions League Best coach: 2021

References

1967 births
Living people
Norwegian male handball players
Norwegian handball coaches